Birdlings Flat, originally named Te Mata Hapuku, is a settlement in Canterbury, New Zealand, at the eastern end of Kaitorete Spit and the southern end of Lake Forsyth, where the lake discharges to the sea. It is not far from eastern end of Lake Ellesmere / Te Waihora. The name Birdlings Flat is also commonly used for the nearby pebble beach on the ocean side of Kaitorete Spit. 

The beach is well known as a place to find small agates and a variety of other attractive rounded pebbles. Due to strong ocean currents, swimming and surfing is not advised. Hector's dolphins live along the beach in notable numbers, and fur seals, whales such as southern right whales, and much more rarely elephant seals cavort and rest there.

History

Birdlings Flat is named after the Birdling family, who were the first European settlers to farm the area. William Birdling was the first member of the Birdling family to arrive in New Zealand. He was employed by George Rhodes in 1843 to come to Banks Peninsula and work as his overseer. William built a house, Waikoko, in the area that was later to bear his name.

On 16 May 1882, a branch line railway was opened to Birdlings Flat from a junction with the Southbridge Branch in Lincoln.  This line became known as the Little River Branch, with the extension to Little River opened on 11 March 1886.  The railway served Birdlings Flat until its closure on 30 June 1962. The railway's old formation remained well preserved and has now been revitalised into a public walking and cycling track, the Little River Rail Trail.

Birdlings Flat has been used as a launch site for sounding rockets. The University of Canterbury used to have a meteorological research station there.

Demographics
It is part of the Banks Peninsula South SA2 statistical area.

Birdlings Flat had a population of 195 at the 2018 New Zealand census, an increase of 45 people (30.0%) since the 2013 census, and an increase of 42 people (27.5%) since the 2006 census. There were 96 households. There were 105 males and 93 females, giving a sex ratio of 1.13 males per female. The median age was 50.1 years (compared with 37.4 years nationally), with 30 people (15.4%) aged under 15 years, 12 (6.2%) aged 15 to 29, 126 (64.6%) aged 30 to 64, and 27 (13.8%) aged 65 or older.

Ethnicities were 83.1% European/Pākehā, 21.5% Māori, 4.6% Asian, and 6.2% other ethnicities (totals add to more than 100% since people could identify with multiple ethnicities).

Although some people objected to giving their religion, 49.2% had no religion, 30.8% were Christian and 9.2% had other religions.

Of those at least 15 years old, 39 (23.6%) people had a bachelor or higher degree, and 30 (18.2%) people had no formal qualifications. The median income was $29,500, compared with $31,800 nationally. The employment status of those at least 15 was that 90 (54.5%) people were employed full-time, 18 (10.9%) were part-time, and 3 (1.8%) were unemployed.

References

External links 

 University of Canterbury - Birdlings Flat radars

Populated places in Canterbury, New Zealand
Banks Peninsula